Mario Vernon-Watson (born 26 April 1971) is a retired Jamaican middle-distance runner who specialised in the 800 metres. He represented his country at the 1997 World Indoor Championships and 1997 World Championships. In addition, he won several medals on regional level.

He holds the national record in the indoor 1000 metres.

Competition record

Personal bests
Outdoor
800 metres – 1:45.58 (Fairfax 1996)
Indoor
800 metres – 1:47.33 (Boston 1997)
1000 metres – 2:19.96 (Boston 2000) NR

References

1971 births
Living people
Jamaican male middle-distance runners
Athletes (track and field) at the 1994 Commonwealth Games
Athletes (track and field) at the 1999 Pan American Games
World Athletics Championships athletes for Jamaica
Commonwealth Games competitors for Jamaica
Pan American Games competitors for Jamaica